The Consolidated School District of New Britain, CT, also known as New Britain Public Schools, is a school district headquartered in New Britain, Connecticut.  The district serves approximately 10,000 students.

Schools

Secondary schools

High schools
 New Britain High School

Middle schools
 DiLoreto Magnet School (K-8)
 Pulaski Middle School
 Louis P. Slade Middle School
 House of Arts Letters and Sciences Academy(HALS Academy) (Magnet)

Primary schools
 Chamberlain Primary School
 DiLoreto Magnet School (K-8)
 Gaffney Elementary School
 Holmes Elementary School 
 Jefferson Elementary School
 Lincoln Elementary School
 Northend Elementary School
 Smalley Academy
 Smith Elementary School
 Vance Village Elementary School

References

External links
New Britain Public Schools
 

School districts in Connecticut
New Britain, Connecticut
Education in Hartford County, Connecticut